"If You Didn't Love Me" is a song recorded by American country music artist Phil Stacey.  If was released in February 2008 as the first single from the album Phil Stacey.  The song reached #28 on the Billboard Hot Country Songs chart.  The song was written by Gary LeVox, Jason Sellers and Wendell Mobley.

Chart performance

References

2008 debut singles
2008 songs
Phil Stacey songs
Songs written by Gary LeVox
Songs written by Wendell Mobley
Songs written by Jason Sellers
Lyric Street Records singles